Alma Mekondjo Nankela worked as a specialist at the National Heritage Council of Namibia until 2021. She developed and implemented heritage resource policies and operational guidelines to ensure sustainable utilization and professional conservation. Nankela oversaw the integration of UNESCO's Conventions and other internationally recognized laws into Namibia’s  cultural heritage resources systems. She advised the Culture and Heritage Sector on the appropriate measures towards research, conservation, management and promotion of Namibia's cultural heritage resources. She worked closely with local communities to strengthen, encourage and promote their involvement in the preservation and management of their heritage properties. She liaised and collaborated with regional, international heritage professionals and other bodies relating to scientific research and conservation of heritage resources. Her notable scientific and management work is particularly known in the Brandberg, Erongo Mountains, Twyfelfontein World Heritage Site, Spitzkoppe Mountains, Sperrgebiet, Khuiseb Delta, Etosha and Kalahari Basin. She has also assisted the National Museum of Namibia in relations to policy development, preservation, curation and management of archaeological objects, repatriated human remains.

Early life and education
Nankela was born in exile in Kwanza-Sul, Angola, during Namibia's liberation struggle. The daughter of a clinical pathologist and physician, her parents worked alongside Nickey Iyambo at Cambuta Health Centre in Cuanza-sul and returned to Namibia just before independence.  Nankela studied B.Ed in History and Geography at the University of Namibia and later earned joint Masters and PhD in Quaternary and Prehistory from the University of Ferrara and the Museum National d’Histoire Naturelle de Paris between 2011 and 2017.

Research Culture Heritage Services (RCHS) Consulting Firm
A quaternary and prehistory specialist, Nankela founded the RCHS, an innovative centre for Archaeosciences and Heritage Practice in Namibia. The firm provides independent and professional consultancy services to local and  global community. It is a multidisciplinary team of experts in archaeology, maritime archaeology, anthropology, architectural heritage, historical heritage, geoheritage, museology, global quality heritage management, GIS, heritage conservation and quaternary geology. Therefore, RCHS supports individuals, farm owners, communities, conservators, proponents, environmental science community and cultural heritage sector, government and non-governmental agencies with archaeosciences specialist services, heritage management & valorization, heritage impact assessment atudies as well as repatriation & restitution efforts.

Awards and accomplishments 
Her most notable discovery to date has been the April 2008 find of a 16th century Portuguese shipwreck in Oranjemund. In 2013, Nankela secured funding of $10,000 from the American Ambassador’s Fund for Cultural Preservation (AFCP) through the American Embassy in Windhoek, towards the restoration of the Spitzkoppe heritage sites in Erongo region. In 2014, Nankela secured European Union funding for the scientific research of archaeological heritage in Erongo Mountains, Namibia. In 2016, Nankela was runner up for researcher of the year by the National Commission on Research, Science and Technology of Namibia.

Committee 
Nankela served as the Chairperson of Namibian National Committee for Human Remains and Heritage Objects (HRC) in the Ministry of Education, Arts and Culture Namibia. The committee was tasked to review Namibia’s current practices for claiming and repatriation of human remains and heritage objects of Namibian origin held in foreign institutions as well as the development of comprehensive set of national guidelines and a national policy for the handling and managing the remains and heritage objects in Namibia.

Research Interests
Namibian quaternary and prehistory, prehistoric rock art, geochemistry analysis of rock paintings, geoinformatics, heritage conservation, provenance research, human remains and heritage objects projects management, cultural heritage policy developments, museum exhibitions and museum and cultural heritage education.

Professional associations
Nankela is a professional member of the International Council on Monuments and Sites (ICOMOS), the Associations of Southern African Professional Archaeologists (ASAPA), the Namibia Scientific Society        (NSS), and the Society of Africanist Archaeologists (SAfA).

Selected works 
2021. A Namibian Experience: The contentious Politics of repatriation of human remains and sacred objects. https://www.museumsbund.de/wp-content/uploads/2021/07/dmb-leitfaden-umgang-menschl-ueberr-en-web-20210625.pdf
2021. Data pretreatment and multivariate analyses for ochre sourcing: Application to Leopard Cave (Erongo, Namibia).https://www.academia.edu/44978722/Data_pretreatment_and_multivariate_analyses_for_ochre_sourcing_Application_to_Leopard_Cave_Erongo_Namibia
2020. Calcium oxalate radiocarbon dating: preliminary tests to date rock art of decorated open-air caves of Erongo Mountains in Namibia.Cambridge University Press. https://www.cambridge.org/core/journals/radiocarbon/article/abs/calcium-oxalate-radiocarbon-dating-preliminary-tests-to-date-rock-art-of-the-decorated-openair-caves-erongo-mountains-namibia/8F368D23986E0AE6C45F65197F6055F1
2020. Rock art in Namibia.Encyclopedia of global archaeology. http://link-springer-com-443.webvpn.fjmu.edu.cn/referenceworkentry/10.1007%2F978-3-030-30018-0_3429
2017. Rock art and Landscape: an empirical Analysis in the content, context and distribution of the rock art sites in Omandumba East and West, Erongo Region-Namibia. PhD Thesis, Paris, Muséum national d'histoire naturelle en cotutelle.
2016. Alma Nankela and Helke Mocke. "Fossil Freshwater Molluscs from Simanya in the Kalahari System, Northern Namibia", 'Communications of the Geological Survey of Namibia 17, p. 66-84.https://www.academia.edu/25575341/Fossil_Freshwater_Molluscs_from_Simanya_in_the_Kalahari_System_Northern_Namibia
2016. Style, techniques and graphic expression of Omandumba Rock Art Sites in Erongo Mountain, Namibia.publication description. British Archaeological Reports S2787.
2015. Rock art of Omandumba Farms in Erongo Mountain, Namibia.ATELIER Etno. https://www.academia.edu/23962103/Rock_art_when_why_and_to_whom_Rock_Art_of_Omandumba_Farm_in_Erongo_Mountain_Namibia2015. Rock Art Research in Namibia: a Synopsis." Africana Studia, Vol. 24 Issue 1, p. 39-56. https://www.africabib.org/rec.php?RID=A00003831
2014. Rock Art and cultural Identity formation in Namibia: reference to Twyfelfontein world heritage site. In Identities and Diversities: Ethnicity and Gender, edited by Lins, et alii, pp. 143-174.
2012. The Landscape Setting of the Rock Arts Sites in Kunene Region, Namibia." In Landscape within rock art'', edited by L. Oosterbeek and G. Nash. Centro de Pré-Historia do Instituto Politécnico (CEIPHAR), Tomar.

References

External links
 Profile on Academia
 Rock art research in Namibia
 From Refugee to Leading Female Archaeologist
 
 

Living people
Year of birth missing (living people)
Prehistorians
Namibian women archaeologists